The 2011 Kaduna State gubernatorial election occurred on April 28, 2011, after a two-day delay due to security concerns. Of the over five political parties contesting, just two were formidable, the PDP and newly formed CPC. The PDP candidate and incumbent governor, Patrick Ibrahim Yakowa, defeated Haruna Saeed of CPC and 12 others, polling 52.34% of the total valid votes.

Patrick Ibrahim Yakowa emerged winner in the PDP gubernatorial primary election. He retained Mukhtar Ramalan Yero as his running mate.

Electoral system 
The Governor of Kaduna State is elected using the plurality voting system.

Results
A total of 14 candidates registered with the Independent National Electoral Commission to contest in the election. The PDP candidate won with a total valid vote of 1,334,319 ballots representing 52.36% of the total votes, closely followed by the CPC candidate who polled 1,133,564 ballot votes representing 44.46% of the total vote cast. ANPP got 33,142 votes, PRP 21,200 votes, and ACN 20,094 votes.

Aftermath 
A crisis erupted after the elections in 18 out of the 23 LGAs across the state, which led to loss of lives and property, with a death toll of between 401 and 957 people as put together by the judicial commission of inquiry.

References 

Kaduna State gubernatorial elections
Kaduna State gubernatorial election
Kaduna State gubernatorial election